Memoir From Antproof Case is a book by American writer Mark Helprin.
The novel was initially published in April 1995.

Plot
An elderly narrator who never reveals his real name writes a manuscript in the Brazilian jungles and hides it, page by page, in a termite-proof suitcase. The goal that he set for himself is truly ambitious: to tell his son about the things that led him to Brazil—after a childhood spent in New York City, and youth—in an elite Swiss clinic for the mentally ill, after studying at Harvard, after his service as a pilot during World War II, after decades of a successful career at a major Wall Street bank, after a number of impossible escapades, and a great love...

Review

—Publishers Weekly

References

External links

Profile on Google books

1995 American novels
Novels by Mark Helprin
Novels set in Brazil